Blue Skies Again is the ninth studio album by American country music artist John Anderson. It was released on November 2, 1987 as his first album for MCA Nashville after leaving Warner Bros. Records in 1986.

Track listing

Personnel
 Donna Anderson - background vocals
 John Anderson - lead vocals
 Eddie Bayers - drums and percussion on "Somewhere Between Ragged and Right"
 Jerry Bridges - bass guitar on "Somewhere Between Ragged and Right"
 Buddy Emmons - steel guitar
 David Hungate - bass guitar
 John Barlow Jarvis - DX-7, piano
 Waylon Jennings - duet vocals on "Somewhere Between Ragged and Right"
 Mike Lawler - synthesizer, keyboards on "Somewhere Between Ragged and Right"
 Larrie Londin - drums
 Gary Scruggs - acoustic guitar on "Somewhere Between Ragged and Right"
 Joe Spivey - fiddle, mandolin
 Billy Joe Walker Jr. - acoustic guitar, electric guitar
 Deanna Anderson Wall - background vocals
 Curtis Young - background vocals
 Reggie Young - electric guitar

Chart performance

Album

Singles

References

1987 albums
MCA Records albums
John Anderson (musician) albums
Albums produced by Jimmy Bowen